Joseph L. Levesque, C.M. is an American Catholic priest of the Congregation of the Mission, better known as the Vincentian Fathers. He was Niagara University's 25th president, serving from March 2000 until 2013. He was succeeded by the Very Rev. James J. Maher, C.M.

Life
Born in North Tarrytown, New York, after high school Levesque entered the Congregation of the Mission. He was ordained a priest in 1967 after studies at Mary Immaculate Seminary in Northampton, Pennsylvania, where he received the degree of Master of Divinity. Following this, he was assigned to serve as an instructor in the Religious Studies Department at St. John's Preparatory School, then in the Bedford-Stuyvesant neighborhood of Brooklyn (1967–1969), St. Joseph's Seminary in Princeton, New Jersey (1969–1970), and Niagara University (1970).

In 1971, Levesque received a Master of Arts in Religious studies from Manhattan College, and in 1977 he obtained the degree of Doctor of Sacred Theology from The Catholic University of America.

Thereafter, Levesque returned to Niagara, resumed teaching and was named dean of the College of Arts and Sciences and director of the university's graduate division in 1978. He remained in the post until 1986. From 1986 to 1990, he served as the university president, superior of the Vincentian community, and teacher of Religion (Morality, Social Justice) at St. Joseph's Seminary (Princeton, New Jersey). In 1990 Father Levesque was elected Provincial Superior of the Eastern American Province of the Congregation of the Mission and Chair of the Board of Trustees of Niagara University and St. John’s University. He stepped down from the position in June 1999 after the maximum nine-year term and subsequently assumed the presidency of Niagara University in 2000.

After leaving Niagara in 2013, Levesque was appointed Interim President of St. John's University, an appointment which began on August 1, 2013, upon the retirement of Donald J. Harrington, C.M.

References

1940s births
20th-century American Roman Catholic priests
Manhattan College alumni
Living people
Mary Immaculate Seminary alumni
Catholic University of America alumni
People from Sleepy Hollow, New York
Presidents of Niagara University
Niagara University faculty
St. John's University (New York City) presidents
Vincentians
21st-century American Roman Catholic priests